Baraa, is an administrative ward in the Arusha District of the Arusha Region of Tanzania. The ward had a population of 12,498 as of 2012.

References

Wards of Arusha City
Wards of Arusha Region